Pagiopalus is a genus of Hawaiian running crab spiders that was first described by Eugène Louis Simon in 1900.

Species
 it contains four species, found only on Hawaii:
Pagiopalus apiculus Suman, 1971 – Hawaii
Pagiopalus atomarius Simon, 1900 (type) – Hawaii
Pagiopalus nigriventris Simon, 1900 – Hawaii
Pagiopalus personatus Simon, 1900 – Hawaii

See also
 List of Philodromidae species

References

Araneomorphae genera
Philodromidae
Spiders of Hawaii